Conrad "Dell" Darling (1861–1904) was a Major League Baseball player.

External links

 Biography at SABR
 Obituary at The Deadball Era

1861 births
1904 deaths
Major League Baseball catchers
Buffalo Bisons (NL) players
Chicago White Stockings players
Chicago Pirates players
St. Louis Browns (AA) players
Syracuse Stars (minor league baseball) players
Toronto Canucks players
Minneapolis Millers (baseball) players
Toledo Black Pirates players
Baseball players from Pennsylvania
Sportspeople from Erie, Pennsylvania
19th-century baseball players